Connecticut Yankee Nuclear Power Plant (CY) was a nuclear power plant located in Haddam Neck, Connecticut. The power plant is on the Connecticut River near the East Haddam Swing Bridge. The plant was commissioned in 1968, ceased electricity production in 1996, and was decommissioned by 2004. The reason for the closure was because operation of the nuclear power station was no longer cost effective. The plant had a capacity of 582MW. Demolition of the containment dome was completed the week of July 17, 2006.

Kenneth Nichols, the deputy to Leslie Groves on the Manhattan Project, was a consultant for the Connecticut Yankee and Yankee Rowe nuclear power plants. He said that while the plants were considered "experimental" and were not expected to be competitive with coal and oil, they "became competitive because of inflation … and the large increase in price of coal and oil." The Connecticut Yankee plant was estimated to cost $100 million.

See also

 Lelan Sillin, Jr.

References

External links 

Connecticut Yankee Website
Connecticut Yankee To Leave A Legacy Hartford Courant article

All of the following are filed under 362 Injun Hollow Road, Haddam, Middlesex County, CT:

Energy infrastructure completed in 1968
Haddam, Connecticut
Historic American Engineering Record in Connecticut
Nuclear power plants in Connecticut
Former nuclear power stations in the United States
Buildings and structures in Middlesex County, Connecticut
Nuclear power stations using pressurized water reactors